Carlo Robelli is the house brand of guitars (flat top, solid body and archtop style), basses, violins, mandolins, banjos, ukuleles, accordions, amplifiers and other musical instruments/accessories manufactured for Sam Ash music stores. In the past, Carlo Robelli products were manufactured in Japan, Brazil, and South Korea, but are currently made in China.

The guitars manufactured at the Peerless facility during the Korean era are of excellent quality.  Examples include the D-120 Manhattan, EL-500, UAS-920F, and CRB-1955 acoustic-electric archtop models, prized among guitarists as affordable but extremely well made instruments, rivaling the American guitars they are copies of.

Although the name sounds Italian, and the instruments display the words "New York, Established 1832", there is no evidence that the company was ever based in either New York or Italy, that there was ever an actual person named Carlo Robelli, or that any instruments bearing the brand name were made as early as the 1930s. However, Sam Ash music stores was founded in New York in 1923, so there may be a connection between that fact and the inscriptions on the instruments.  

Musical instrument manufacturing companies of Italy